Lega Toscana may refer to two political parties in Italy:
Lega Toscana, originally established as "Movimento per la Toscana", later known as "Alleanza Toscana" and "Lega Nord Toscana"
Lega Toscana (2011), originally established as "Lega per la Toscana" (English: League for Tuscany)